Asia News is a non-governmental Iranian economic news website and newspaper.

Seizure of Asia news 
Asia established in 2001 by Iraj Jamshidi. In twenty years of activity, the newspaper was closed twice due to non-compliance with government laws. The newspaper is now in its third edition.

References

External links
 

Iranian news websites
Publications established in 2001
Newspapers published in Tehran
2001 establishments in Iran
Business newspapers